Anasuya is an Indian feminine given name that may refer to
Anasuya, a personage in Hindu mythology
Anasuya Bharadwaj, Indian television presenter
Anasuya Devī (1923–1985), Indian spiritual leader
Anasuya Sarabhai, pioneer of the women's labour movement in India
Anasuya Shankar (1928–1963), Indian writer of modern fiction

Indian feminine given names